Sciapus contristans is a species of long-legged fly in the family Dolichopodidae.

References

Sciapodinae
Insects described in 1817
Taxa named by Christian Rudolph Wilhelm Wiedemann